KRFY (88.5 FM) is a community radio station licensed to serve Ponderay, Idaho. The station is owned and operated by the nonprofit Panhandle Community Radio, Inc., a 501(c)(3) organization, and airs a variety format.

The station was assigned the KRFY call letters by the Federal Communications Commission on September 29, 2009.

References

External links
 Official Website
 

RFY
Radio stations established in 2011
2011 establishments in Idaho
Variety radio stations in the United States
Community radio stations in the United States
Bonner County, Idaho